, is a popular genre of Japanese literature.

History

Name 
When Western detective fiction spread to Japan, it created a new genre called detective fiction in Japanese literature. After World War II the genre was renamed deductive reasoning fiction. The genre is sometimes called mystery, although this includes non-detective fiction as well.

Development 
Edogawa Rampo is the first Japanese modern mystery writer and the founder of the Detective Story Club in Japan. Rampo was an admirer of western mystery writers. He gained his fame in early 1920s, when he began to bring to the genre many bizarre, erotic and even fantastic elements. This is partly because of the social tension before World War II.

In 1957, Seicho Matsumoto received the Mystery Writers of Japan Award for his short story . The Face and Matsumoto's subsequent works began the  within the genre, which emphasized social realism, described crimes in an ordinary setting and sets motives within a wider context of social injustice and political corruption.

Since the 1980s, a  has surfaced. It demands restoration of the classic rules of detective fiction and the use of more self-reflective elements, largely inspired by the works of Ellery Queen and John Dickson Carr. Famous authors of this movement include Soji Shimada, Yukito Ayatsuji, Rintaro Norizuki, Alice Arisugawa, Kaoru Kitamura and Taku Ashibe.

Quotation

Japanese mystery awards
Awards for best works published in the previous year
 Mystery Writers of Japan Award (since 1948) - awarded by Mystery Writers of Japan (founded in 1947)
 Honkaku Mystery Award (since 2001) - awarded by Honkaku Mystery Writers Club of Japan (founded in 2000)
Awards for lifetime achievement
 Japan Mystery Literature Award for Lifetime Achievement (ja) (since 1998)
Awards for unpublished mystery novels
 Edogawa Rampo Prize (since 1955) - awarded by Mystery Writers of Japan
 Yokomizo Seishi Mystery Award (ja) (since 1981)
 Ayukawa Tetsuya Award (ja) (since 1990)
 Mephisto Prize (since 1996)
 Japan Mystery Literature Award for New Writers (ja) (since 1998)
 Kono Mystery ga Sugoi! Award (ja) (since 2002)
 Fukuyama Mystery Literature Award for New Writers (ja) (since 2009)
 Agatha Christie Award (since 2011)
 Shincho Mystery Award (since 2014)

Top book lists of mystery fiction published in Japan
 Tozai Mystery Best 100
 Kono Mystery ga Sugoi!
 Honkaku Mystery Best 10

Japanese mystery writers

Aozora Bunko
Listed below are Japanese mystery writers whose works are available in Aozora Bunko, a Japanese digital library.

Ruiko Kuroiwa's short story Muzan (1889), which is also available in Aozora Bunko, is one of the earliest Japanese detective stories.

Japanese detective manga series
 Case Closed aka Detective Conan (written and illustrated by Gosho Aoyama)
 Kindaichi Case Files (written by Yōzaburō Kanari or Seimaru Amagi and illustrated by Fumiya Satō)
 Q.E.D. (written and illustrated by Motohiro Katō)
 Detective School Q (written by Seimaru Amagi and illustrated by Fumiya Satō)

Video game adaptions
There are visual novels and adventure games that take inspiration from this fiction genre.
 The Portopia Serial Murder Case, a 1983 video game by Enix.
 Nintendo has published many video game adaptations of the Japanese detective fiction formula. Starting with the Famicom Detective Club franchise. They also published a Detective Pikachu video game, which itself adapted into a 2019 film.

See also
 Golden Age of Detective Fiction
 Detective fiction
 Mystery fiction
 Crime fiction
 Japanese literature
 Japanese horror
 Japanese science fiction
 Japan Three Great Mysteries (ja)
 :Category:Japanese mystery writers
 :Category:Japanese crime fiction writers

Explanatory notes

References

 
 . (2000). "Parallel lives of Japan's master detectives". Japan Quarterly, 47(4), 52-57.  Retrieved November 1, 2009, from ProQuest Asian Business and Reference. (Document ID: 63077831).

External links
 Zoom Japon, June 1, 2010, pp 4–7 
 List of Japanese mystery fiction in English translation at Euro Crime

Japanese literature
Detective fiction